"Shut Up" is a pop song written by Suggs and Chris Foreman. It was recorded by British pop/ska band Madness, and was featured on the band's third album 7. It was released as a single on 11 September 1981, spending 10 weeks in the UK Singles Chart. It reached a high position of number 7.

The song tells a story of a criminal who, despite obvious evidence, tries to convince people he is not guilty. Even though the song is called "Shut Up", the two words do not appear in the lyrics at all. However, they were the final words of an additional verse which was part of an early version of the song.

Music video
The promotional video for the single released featured the band dressed as a group of criminals, then later as police officers, working for and later chasing, lead singer Suggs. Suggs is presented as a used car salesman/criminal (with mask, bowler hat and black suit/vertical striped shirt). The video implies that Suggs' character has his friends steal cars for his business, though at the start of the video it is implied that he has been caught for his crimes by the police (with the song being him pleading his innocence).

In one sequence, the costumed band gather round as Chris Foreman (in police uniform) plays the song's guitar solo on the "Super Yob" guitar, previously owned by Dave Hill of Slade.

Appearances
In addition to its single release and appearance on the album 7, "Shut Up" also appears on the Madness collections Complete Madness, It's... Madness Too, The Business, Divine Madness (a.k.a. The Heavy Heavy Hits) and Our House. It also features on two US Madness compilations, Madness and Total Madness.

Formats and track listings
These are the formats and track listings of major single releases of "Shut Up".

7" Single
"Shut Up" (McPherson/Foreman) - 3:23
"A Town With No Name" (Foreman) - 2:52

12" Single
"Shut Up (full length version)"  (McPherson/Foreman) - 4:05
"Never Ask Twice" (McPherson/Barson) - 3:03
"A Town With No Name" (Foreman) - 2:52

Dutch 12" Single (STIFF BUY-IT 126, released with "12 INCH" a title)
"Shut Up" (McPherson/Foreman) - 3:55
"Day On The Town" (McPherson/Foreman) - 2:50
"Never Ask Twice" (McPherson/Barson) - 2:55
"A Town With No Name" (Foreman) - 2:45

Charts

Certifications and sales

References

External links
 

1981 singles
Madness (band) songs
Songs written by Suggs (singer)
Songs written by Chris Foreman
1981 songs
Stiff Records singles
Song recordings produced by Clive Langer
Song recordings produced by Alan Winstanley